Usman Ɗan Fodio  (15 December 1754 – 20 April 1817) was a Fulani scholar, Sunni Islamic religious teacher, revolutionary, and philosopher who founded the Sokoto Caliphate and ruled as its first caliph.

Born in Gobir, Usman was a descendant the Torodbe clans of urbanized ethnic Fulani people living in the Hausa Kingdoms since the early 1400s. In early life, Usman became well-educated in Islamic studies and soon, he began to preach Sunni Islam throughout Nigeria and Cameroon. He wrote more than a hundred books concerning religion, government, culture, and society. He developed a critique of existing African Muslim elites for what he saw as their greed, paganism, violation of the standards of the Sharia.

Usman formed and began an Islamic religious and social revolution which spread from Gobir throughout modern Nigeria and Cameroon, and was echoed in a jihad movement led by the Fulani people across West Africa. In 1803, he founded the Sokoto Caliphate and his followers pledged allegiance to him as the Commander of the Faithful. Usman declared jihad against the Hausa Kings and defeated the kings. Under Usman's leadership, the caliphate conquered Burkina Faso, Cameroon, Southern Niger and most of Northern Nigeria. Ɗan Fodio declined much of the pomp of rulership, and while developing contacts with religious reformists and jihad leaders across Africa, he soon passed actual leadership of the Sokoto state to his son, Muhammed Bello.

He encouraged literacy and scholarship, for women as well as men, and several of his daughters emerged as scholars and writers. His writings and sayings continue to be much quoted today, and are often affectionately referred to as Shehu in Nigeria. Some followers consider ɗan Fodio to have been a mujaddid, a divinely sent "reformer of Islam".
Shehu ɗan Fodio's uprising was a major episode of a movement described as the Fula jihads in the 17th, 18th, and 19th centuries. It followed the jihads successfully waged in Futa Bundu, Futa Tooro, and Fouta Djallon between 1650 and 1750, which led to the creation of those three Islamic states. In his turn, the Shehu inspired a number of later West African jihads, including those of Seku Amadu, founder of the Massina Empire, Omar Saidou Tall, founder of the Toucouleur Empire, who married one of ɗan Fodio's granddaughters, and Modibo Adama, founder of the Adamawa Emirate.

Early life 
Usman was born in December 1754 and was a Fulani descendant of a Torodbe family that was well established in Hausaland. His father Muhammad Fodio was an Islamic scholar. Usman's mother Hauwa is believed to be a direct descendent of the Islamic prophet Muhammad. While Usman was young, he and his family shifted Degel where he studied the Quran. At age 20, he set up his school in Degel and preached for a stricter observance of Islam.

Soon after, he became well-educated in classical Islamic science, philosophy, and theology and also became a revered religious thinker. His teacher, Jibril ibn Umar was a powerful intellectual and religious leader at the time, who was a staunch proponent of Jihad. In 1774, Usman began his itinerant preaching as a  Mallam and continued preaching for twelve years in Gobir and Kebbi, followed by further five years in Zamfara. Among Usman's well-known students include his younger brother Abdullah, the Hausa King Yunfa, and many others.

Usman criticized Hausa rulers with his writings, condemning them for enslavement, worshiping idols, sacrificial practices, taxation practices, arbitrary rule, and greed. He also insisted on the observance of the Maliki fiqh in personal observances as well as in commercial and criminal law. Usman also denounced the mixing of men and women, pagan customs, dancing at bridal feasts, and inheritance practices contrary to Sharia. He was also influenced by the mushahada or mystical visions he was having. In 1789 a vision led him to believe he had the power to work miracles, and to teach his own mystical wird, or litany. His litanies are still widely practiced and distributed in the Islamic world. In the 1790s, Usman later had visions of Abdul Qadir Gilani, (the founder of the Qadiri tariqah) and ascension to heaven, where he was initiated into the Qadiriyya and the spiritual lineage of the Prophet. Usman later became head of his Qadiriyya brotherhood calling for the purification of Islamic practices. His theological writings dealt with concepts of the mujaddid (renewer) and the role of the Ulama in teaching history, and other works in Arabic and the Fula language. Usman broke from the royal court and used his influence to secure approval for creating a religious community in his hometown of Degel that would, he hoped, be a model town. He stayed there for 20 years, writing, teaching, and preaching. As in other Islamic societies, the autonomy of Muslim communities under ulama leadership made it possible to resist the state and the state version of Islam in the name of sharia and the ideal caliphate.

Caliphate

Origins and foundation 
In 1780–the 1790s, Usman's reputation increased as he appealed to justice and morality and rallied the outcasts of Hausa society. The Hausa peasants, slaves, and preachers supported Usman, as well as the Fulbe and Fulani pastoralists. These pastoralist communities were led by the clerics living in rural communities who were Fulfulde speakers and closely connected to the pastoralists. Many of Usman's followers later hold the most important offices of the new states. Usman's jihad served to integrate several peoples into a single religious-political movement.

In 1797–98, King Nafata of Gobir forbade Shaykhs to preach, wear turbans and veils, prohibited conversions, and ordered converts to Islam to return to their old religion. This was highly resented by Usman who wrote in his book Tanbih al-Ikhwan 'ala away al-Sudan (“Concerning the Government of Our Country and Neighboring Countries in Sudan”) Usman wrote: "The government of a country is the government of its king without question. If the king is a Muslim, his land is Muslim; if he is an unbeliever, his land is a land of unbelievers. In these circumstances, anyone must leave it for another country".

In 1802, Nafata's successor Yunfa, a former student of Usman, turned against him, revoking Degel's autonomy and attempting to assassinate Usman. Yunfa then turned for aid to the other leaders of the Hausa states, warning them that Usman could trigger a widespread jihad. In February 1804, Usman and his followers, carried out a hijra (migration) to the western grasslands of Gudu, where they turned for help to the local Fulani nomads. Usman's followers entitled him the Commander of the Believers and elected him as the leader. They also gave the title Sarkin Muslim (Head of Muslims) to Usman. In the same year, Usman started the jihad and founded the Sokoto Caliphate. By this time, Usman had assembled a wide following among the Fulani, Hausa peasants, and Toureg nomads. This made him a political as well as religious leader, giving him the authority to declare and pursue a jihad, raise an army and become its commander. There were widespread uprisings in Hausaland and its leadership was largely composed of the Fulani and widely supported by the Hausa peasantry, who felt over-taxed and oppressed by their rulers.

Expansion of Islam 

After Usman declared Jihad, he gathered an army of Hausa warriors to attack Yunfa's forces in Tsuntua. Yunfa's army, composed of Hausa warriors and Tuareg allies, defeated Usman's forces and killed about 2,000 soldiers, 200 of whom were hafiz (memorizers of the Quran). Yunfa's victory was short-lived as soon after, Usman captured Kebbi and Gwandu in the following year. At the time of the war, Fulani communications were carried along trade routes and rivers draining into the Niger-Benue valley, as well as the delta and the lagoons. The call for jihad reached not only other Hausa states such as Kano, Daura, Katsina, and Zaria, but also Borno, Gombe, Adamawa, Nupe. These were all places with major or minor groups of Fulani alims.

By 1808, Usman had defeated the rulers of Gobir, Kano, Katsina, and other Hausa Kingdoms. After only a few years of the Fulani War, Usman found himself in command of the Hausa state and the Fulani Empire. The Sokoto Caliphate had become the largest state south of the Sahara at the time. In 1812, the caliphate's administration was reorganized, with Usman's son Muhammed Bello and brother Abdullahi dan Fodio carrying on the jihad and administering the western and eastern governance respectively. Around this time, Usman returned to teaching and writing about Islam. Usman also worked to establish an efficient government grounded in Islamic law. 

The Sokoto Caliphate was a combination of an Islamic state and a modified Hausa monarchy. Muhammed Bello introduced Islamic administration, Muslim judges, market inspectors, and prayer leaders were appointed, and an Islamic tax and land system were instituted with revenues on the land considered kharaj and the fees levied on individual subjects called jizya, as in classical Islamic times. The Fulani cattle-herding nomads were sedentarized and converted to sheep and goat raising as part of an effort to bring them under the rule of Muslim law. Mosques and Madrassahs were built to teach the populace, Islam. The state patronized large numbers of religious scholars or mallams. Sufism became widespread. Arabic, Hausa, and Fulfulde languages saw a revival of poetry, and Islam was taught in Hausa and Fulfulde.

Death 
In 1815, Usman moved to Sokoto, where Bello built him a house in the western suburbs. Usman died in the same city on 20 April 1817, at the age of 62. After his death, his son Muhammed Bello, succeeded his as amir al-mu’minin and became the second caliph of the Sokoto Caliphate. Usman's brother Abdullahi was given the title Emir of Gwandu and was placed in charge of the Western Emirates of Nupe. Thus, all Hausa states, parts of Nupe and Fulani outposts in Bauchi and Adamawa were all ruled by a single political-religious system. By 1830 the jihad had engulfed most of what are now northern Nigeria and the northern Cameroons. From the time of Usman ɗan Fodio to the British conquest at the beginning of the 20th century there were 12 caliphs.

Legacy 

Usman has been viewed as the most important reforming leader of Africa. Muslims view him as a Mujaddid (renewer of the faith). Many of the Fulani led by Usman ɗan Fodio were unhappy that the rulers of the Hausa states were mingling Islam with aspects of the traditional regional religion. Usman created a theocratic state with a stricter interpretation of Islam. In Tanbih al-ikhwan 'ala ahwal al-Sudan, he wrote: "As for the sultans, they are undoubtedly unbelievers, even though they may profess the religion of Islam, because they practice polytheistic rituals and turn people away from the path of God and raise the flag of a worldly kingdom above the banner of Islam. All this is unbelief according to the consensus of opinions".
In Islam outside the Arab World, David Westerlund wrote: "The jihad resulted in a federal theocratic state, with extensive autonomy for emirates, recognizing the spiritual authority of the caliph or the sultan of Sokoto".
Usman addressed in his books what he saw as the flaws and demerits of the African non-Muslim or nominally Muslim rulers. Some of the accusations he made were corruption at various levels of the administration and neglect of the rights of ordinary people. Usman also criticized heavy taxation and obstruction of the business and trade of the Hausa states by the legal system.
Dan Fodio believed in a state without written constitution, which was based on the Qur’an, the Sunnah and the ijma.

Lineage and family 
Usman ɗan Fodio was described as well past 6 feet, lean and looking very much like his mother Sayda Hauwa. His brother Abdullahi dan Fodio (1761–1829) was also over 6 feet in height and was described as looking more like their father Muhammad Fodio, with a darker skin hue and a portly physique later in his life.

In Rawd al-Janaan (The Meadows of Paradise), Waziri Gidado ɗan Laima (1777–1851) listed ɗan Fodio's wives as:

His first cousin Maymuna with whom he had 11 children, including Aliyu (1770s–1790s) and the twins Hasan (1793– November 1817) and Nana Asmaʼu (1793–1864). Maymuna died sometime after the birth of her youngest children.

Aisha ɗan Muhammad Sa'd. She was also known as "Gaabdo" (Joy in Fulfulde) and as "Iyya Garka" (Hausa for Lady of the House/Compound). Iyya Garka was famed for her Islamic knowledge and for being the matriarch of the family. She outlived her husband by many decades. Among others, she was the mother of:

 Muhammad Sa'd (1777-before 1800)

Writings 

Usman ɗan Fodio "wrote hundreds of works on Islamic sciences ranging from creed, Maliki jurisprudence, hadith criticism, poetry and Islamic spirituality", the majority of them being in Arabic. He also penned about 480 poems in Arabic, Fulfulde, and Hausa.

See also 
 Fulani Empire
 Hausa Kingdoms
 History of Nigeria
 Legends of Africa
 Makera Assada
 Muhammad al-Maghili
 Muhammed Bello
Nana Asmaʼu
 Sokoto
 Usmanu Danfodiyo University

References

Bibliography 

 F. H. El-Masri, "The life of Uthman b. Foduye before the Jihad", Journal of the Historical Society of Nigeria (1963), pp. 435–48.
 Writings of Usman dan Fodio, in The Human Record: Sources of Global History, Fourth Edition/ Volume II: Since 1500,  (page:233-236)
 Asma'u, Nana. Collected Works of Nana Asma'u. Jean Boyd and Beverly B. Mack, eds. East Lansing, Michigan: University of Michigan Press, 1997.
 Omipidan Teslim "Usman Dan Fodio  (1754–1817)", OldNaija
 Mervyn Hiskett. The Sword of Truth: The Life and Times of the Shehu Usuman Dan Fodio. Northwestern University Press; 1973. Reprint edition (March 1994). 
 Ibraheem Sulaiman. The Islamic State and the Challenge of History: Ideals, Policies, and Operation of the Sokoto Caliphate. Mansell (1987). 
 Ibraheem Sulaiman. A Revolution in History: The Jihad of Usman dan Fodio.
 Isam Ghanem. "The Causes and Motives of the Jihad in Northern Nigeria".  in Man, New Series, Vol. 10, No. 4 (December 1975), pp. 623–624
 Usman Muhammad Bugaje. The Tradition of Tajdeed in West Africa: An Overview International Seminar on Intellectual Tradition in the Sokoto Caliphate & Borno.  Center for Islamic Studies, University of Sokoto (June 1987)
 Usman Muhammad Bugaje. "The Contents, Methods and Impact of Shehu Usman Dan Fodio's Teachings (1774–1804)"
 Usman Muhammad Bugaje. The Jihad of Shaykh Usman Dan Fodio and its Impact Beyond the Sokoto Caliphate. A Paper read at a Symposium in Honour of Shaykh Usman Dan Fodio at International University of Africa, Khartoum, Sudan, from 19 to 21 November 1995.
 Usman Muhammad Bugaje. Shaykh Uthman Ibn Fodio and the Revival of Islam in Hausaland, (1996).
 Helen Chapin Metz, ed. Nigeria: A Country Study. Washington: GPO for the Library of Congress, 1991.
 B. G. Martin. Muslim Brotherhoods in Nineteenth-Century Africa. 1978.
 Jean Boyd. The Caliph's Sister, Nana Asma'u, 1793–1865: Teacher, Poet and Islamic Leader.
Lapidus, Ira M. A History of Islamic Societies. 3rd edn. New York, NY: Cambridge University Press, 2014. pp. 469–472.
 Nikki R. Keddie. "The Revolt of Islam, 1700 to 1993: Comparative Considerations & Relations to Imperialism", in Comparative Studies in Society & History, Vol. 36, No. 3 (July 1994), pp. 463–487
 R. A. Adeleye. Power and Diplomacy in Northern Nigeria 1804–1906'''. 1972.
 Hugh A. S. Johnston. Fulani Empire of Sokoto. Oxford: 1967. .
 S. J. Hogben and A. H. M. Kirk-Greene, The Emirates of Northern Nigeria, Oxford: 1966.
 J. S. Trimgham, Islam in West Africa, Oxford, 1959.
 'Umar al-Nagar. "The Asanid of Shehu Dan Fodio: How Far are they a Contribution to his Biography?", Sudanic Africa, Volume 13, 2002 (pp. 101–110).
 Paul E. Lovejoy. Transformations in Slavery – A History of Slavery in Africa. No 36 in the African Studies series, Cambridge University Press, 
 Paul E. Lovejoy. "Fugitive Slaves: Resistance to Slavery in the Sokoto Caliphate", In Resistance: Studies in African, Caribbean, & Afro-American History.  University of Massachusetts. (1986).
 Paul E. Lovejoy, Mariza C. Soares (eds). Muslim Encounters With Slavery in Brazil.  Markus Wiener Pub (2007) 
 M. A. Al-Hajj, "The Writings of Shehu Uthman Dan Fodio", Kano Studies, Nigeria (1), 2(1974/77).
 David Robinson. "Revolutions in the Western Sudan," in Levtzion, Nehemia and Randall L. Pouwels (eds). The History of Islam in Africa. Oxford: James Currey Ltd, 2000.
 Bunza Adam, Abba Idris., "Re-inventing Islamic Civilization in the Sudanic Belt: The Role of Sheikh Usman Dan Fodio." Journal of Modern Education Review 4.6 (2014): 457–465. online
 Suleiman, I. The African Caliphate: The Life, Works and Teachings of Shaykh Usman Dan Fodio (1757–1817)'' (2009).

External links 
 African Legends
 SIIASI Uthman Dan Fodio
WebPulaaku

1754 births
1817 deaths
18th-century Nigerian people
19th-century Nigerian people
19th-century rulers in Africa
Arabic-language writers
Asharis
Fula-language writers
Fulani warriors
Hausa-language writers
Muslim missionaries
Nigerian Arabic poets
Nigerian Fula people
Nigerian philosophers
Nigerian royalty
Nigerian Sufi religious leaders
Nigerian warriors
Nigerian writers
Self-proclaimed caliphs
Sultans of Sokoto
Usman